Midland Community Stadium (MCS) is located in Midland, Michigan and is owned by Midland Public Schools. The stadium is notable because the fan seating is built into man-made earthen hills, and does not have scaffolding type bleachers that are typical for high school stadiums. There is aluminum bench seating for approximately 7,500 (4,000 on the home side; 3,500 on the visitor side), but for the yearly football grudge match between the two cross-town rivals, it is not uncommon for over 10,000 fans to attend.

History
The stadium was built adjacent to Midland High School during the summer of 1958 and dedicated as "Midland Stadium" on Oct. 17 of that year during a win over the Alpena Wildcats. The stadium, high school and Parkdale Elementary were built on the old Midland Airfield, replaced by Barstow Airport.
After the city's second high school, Herbert Henry Dow High School opened in 1968, the name was changed to Midland Community Stadium because the facility was used by both schools as their home field for football & soccer games and track meets.

The stadium was briefly home to the Tri-City Apollos of the Continental Football League for one season in 1969. The team was so bad that they were known locally as the Tri-City Apollo-gies. The league folded that same year.

Nearby Northwood University has played at MCS, when ticket demand greatly exceeds the 3,000 seat capacity of their Hantz Stadium.

Improvements
The field was upgraded in 2004 with installation of an artificial surface, AstroTurf XPe, the same product used at many professional and college sports facilities. Very few high school fields use artificial turf due to the high cost. Additional improvements that same year included paving & surfacing, fencing, a new synthetic track surface and audio & video cable installation to simplify setup for broadcast and/or taping of stadium events.

In 2021, a $1 million project was completed which introduced all aluminum stadium seating, additional handrails, and wheelchair-accessible seating with partner benches.

References

External links
Midland Public Schools website
Midland High School website
H. H. Dow High School website

Midland, Michigan
Sports venues in Michigan
Buildings and structures in Midland County, Michigan
Music venues completed in 1955
1955 establishments in Michigan